Mertensia oblongifolia is a species of flowering plant in the borage family known by the common names oblongleaf bluebells and sagebrush bluebells.

It is native to the western United States, where it grows in several types of habitat, including meadows and sagebrush.

Description
 Mertensia oblongifolia is a perennial herb producing many erect stems from a thick, branching caudex, approaching 40 centimeters in maximum height. The leaves are oval to lance-shaped, located all along the stem. The inflorescence is a dense, sometimes crowded cluster of hanging blue tubular flowers with expanded, bell-like mouths. The flower measures 1 to 2 centimeters long.

External links

Jepson Manual Treatment of Mertensia oblongifolia
Mertensia oblongifolia — UC Photo gallery

oblongifolia
Flora of the Western United States
Flora without expected TNC conservation status